The Thalia Theater is one of the three state-owned theatres in Hamburg, Germany. It was founded in 1843 by Charles Maurice Schwartzenberger and named after the muse Thalia. Today, it is home to one of Germany's most famous ensembles and stages around 9 new plays per season. Current theatre manager is Joachim Lux, who in 2009/10 succeeded Ulrich Khuon.

In addition to its main building, located in the street Raboisen in the Altstadt quarter near the Binnenalster and Gerhart-Hauptmann-Platz in Hamburg's inner city, the theatre operates a smaller stage, used for experimental plays, the Thalia in der Gaußstraße, located in the borough of Altona.

Plays
In October 1991 Ruth Berghaus directed Bertolt Brecht's In The Jungle of Cities (German: Im Dickicht der Städte) as part of a series of 'related texts', as she called them (which also included Büchner's Danton's Death).

Performed by the ensemble in 2006
Thalia Theater
Sommergäste by Maxim Gorki
Quixote in der Stadt
Die schmutzigen Hände (Dirty Hands) by Jean-Paul Sartre
Das Versprechen by Armin Petras, inspired by Friedrich Dürrenmatt
Ein Mitsommernachtstraum (A Midsummer Night's Dream) by William Shakespeare
Buddenbrooks by Thomas Mann, edited by John von Düffel
Die Jungfrau von Orleans by Friedrich Schiller
Effi Briest by Theodor Fontane
Penthesilea by Heinrich von Kleist, in cooperation with the Salzburg Festival
Rose Bernd by Gerhart Hauptmann
Lulu by Frank Wedekind
Der Bus (Das Zeug einer Heiligen] by Lukas Bärfuss
Mnozil Brass
Minna von Barnhelm (Minna of Barnhelm) by Gotthold Ephraim Lessing
Klein Zaches genannt Zinnober by Stefan Moskov, inspired by E.T.A. Hoffmann
Ulrike Maria Stuart by Elfriede Jelinek

Thalia in der Gaußstraße
Performed by the theatre's ensemble in 2006
Café Umberto by Moritz Rinke
Zeit zu Lieben Zeit zu Sterben by Fritz Kater
Dies ist kein Liebeslied by Karen Duve
Das Ende vom Anfang by Seán O'Casey
Antigone by Sophocles
Liebesruh by Jan Neumann
Bartleby, der Schreiber by Herman Melville
Sauerstoff by Iwan Wyrypajew
Norway.Today by Igor Bauersima
WE ARE CAMERA/JASONMATERIAL by Fritz Kater
Limited Edition: Das Wunder von St. Georg by Peer Paul Gustavsson
Ware Liebe
Hinter euren Zäunen
Durchgebrannt by Ursula Rani Sarma
Kick & Rush by Andri Beyeler
Abalon, One Nite in Bangkok by Fritz Kater
Z by Nino Haratischwili
Mein Kampf by George Tabori

Criticism for pro-Russian activities
In 2022, during the Russian war against Ukraine, the theater drew strong criticism from the Ukrainian community of Germany for showing a play by the Russian playwright Kirill Serebrennikov which glamourizes the genocide, whitewashes Russian war crimes and equates the victims with the criminals.

Notes

References

 Meech, Tony. 1994. "Brecht's Early Plays." In Thomson and Sacks (1994, 43–55).
 Thomson, Peter and Glendyr Sacks, eds. 1994. The Cambridge Companion to Brecht. Cambridge Companions to Literature Ser. Cambridge: Cambridge University Press. .

External links

Thalia Theater

Theatres in Hamburg
Buildings and structures in Hamburg-Mitte
Tourist attractions in Hamburg